

Paleomycology

newly named fungi

Arthropods

newly named insects

Vertebrates

Conodonts

Newly named Actinopterygii ("Ray-finned Fish")

Dinosaurs 
 All Anatosaurus species except A. copei were moved to the previously existing genus Edmontosaurus by Brett-Surman
 "Seismosaurus" gastroliths documented.

Newly named dinosaurs 
Data courtesy of George Olshevsky's dinosaur genera list.

Newly named birds

References

Works cited
 
 Sanders F, Manley K, Carpenter K. Gastroliths from the Lower Cretaceous sauropod Cedarosaurus weiskopfae. In: Tanke D.H, Carpenter K, editors. Mesozoic vertebrate life: new research inspired by the paleontology of Philip J. Currie. Indiana University Press; Bloomington, IN: 2001. pp. 166–180.

 
1990s in paleontology
Paleontology
Paleontology